Brenna Youngblood (born 1979) is an American artist based in Los Angeles who is known for creating photographic collages, sculpture, and paintings. Her work explores issues of African-American identity and representation.

Education
Youngblood received a BFA from the California State University, Long Beach in 2002 and an MFA from the University of California, Los Angeles in 2006.

Work
Youngblood's work often references historically significant moments and organizations in African-American history such as her 2017 sculpture M.I.A. which "refers to the Montgomery Improvement Association, a group co-organized by Martin Luther King, Jr. to guide the Montgomery bus boycott protest in 1955".

Youngblood has held 11 solo exhibitions from 2006 to 2017. Some of Youngblood's first solo exhibits (2007 & 2008) were at the Margo Leavin [Gallery].  She has also been a part of 16 group exhibitions from 2004 to 2018. Many of Youngblood's exhibitions have been shown largely in Los Angeles and New York City. Her work is included in the collection of the Seattle Art Museum, She was included in the 2019 traveling exhibition Young, Gifted, and Black: The Lumpkin-Boccuzzi Family Collection of Contemporary Art.

Awards
 2015 Seattle Art Museum Gwendolyn Knight/Jacob Lawrence Prize
 2014 The Hermitage Artist Retreat, Englewood, FL
 2012 Los Angeles County Museum of Art Young Talent Award/AHAN Award.

References

External links 
Brenna Youngblood at Roberts Projects, Los Angeles, CA

1979 births
Living people
Date of birth missing (living people)
Artists from Riverside, California
California State University, Los Angeles alumni
California State University, Long Beach alumni
University of California, Los Angeles alumni
American collage artists
Women collage artists
Sculptors from California
Painters from California
21st-century American sculptors
21st-century American painters
21st-century American women artists
African-American women artists
African-American painters
African-American sculptors
21st-century African-American women
21st-century African-American artists
20th-century African-American people
20th-century African-American women